Philip Brett (1816 – 9 January 1872) was an English cricketer. He played two first-class matches for Cambridge University Cricket Club between 1846 and 1847.

See also
 List of Cambridge University Cricket Club players

References

External links
 

1816 births
1872 deaths
English cricketers
Cambridge University cricketers